Velavoor is a village in the Thiruvananthapuram district of Kerala, India.

References

Villages in Thiruvananthapuram district